Hillel Schenker is co-editor of the Palestine-Israel Journal, a Jerusalem-based independent English language quarterly founded and run by a group of Palestinian and Israeli academics and journalists.

Career
He was as an editor of New Outlook, the Israeli peace monthly and has written for The Guardian, The Nation, Los Angeles Times, L.A. Weekly, Tikkun, Israel Horizons, In These Times, and the Israeli press. Schenker is a co-founder of the Peace Now movement, served for many years as spokesperson for the Israeli branch of International Physicians for the Prevention of Nuclear War and is an International Advisory Board member of the Global Majority center for non-violent conflict resolution based at the Monetary Institute of International Studies.

Awards
In 2012, Schenker was jointly awarded the Outstanding Contribution to Peace Award, alongside his co-editor and founder of the Palestine-Israel Journal Ziad Abuzayyad at the eighth International Media Awards held on 5 May.

References

External links
 http://www.pij.org/authors.php?id=240
 http://internationalmediaawards.org/

Living people
Israeli editors
Year of birth missing (living people)